The Best is the first greatest hits album by American singer Ariana Grande, released exclusively in Japan. It features songs from her first three studio albums: Yours Truly (2013), My Everything (2014) and Dangerous Woman (2016), as well as her duet with John Legend, "Beauty and the Beast" for the Beauty and the Beast: Original Motion Picture Soundtrack (2017) and "Faith" with Stevie Wonder for the Sing: Original Motion Picture Soundtrack (2016). It was released, digitally and physically, only in Japan on September 27, 2017, by Universal Music Japan. 

In Japan, the album sold 24,764 copies in its opening week, where it peaked at number two on the Oricon Albums Chart. It ranked at numbers 68 and 73 on the Oricon year-end listings for 2017 and 2018, respectively.

Release and artwork
The Best was released on September 27, 2017, by Universal Music Japan, in four different formats. The standard edition (which was also released digitally) features eighteen tracks. The deluxe edition features the eighteen tracks CD and a bonus DVD including four music videos while the Blu-ray version of the album contains ten music videos. Each physical version comes with a store exclusive gift. Albums bought at HMV stores include an A4 Clear file, albums bought at Tower Records stores include a can badge, albums bought at Tsutaya Records includes a post card, and albums bought at Universal Music Store include a B2 notification poster.

Commercial performance
Commercially, The Best charted strongly upon release in Japan. The album opened with 27,764 copies sold in its first week, allowing it to peak at number two the Oricon Albums Chart, while debuting at number one on the Japanese Hot Albums (Billboard Japan) It also peaked at number two on the Japanese Top Album Sales chart.

The Best charted at numbers 68 and 73 on the Oricon Albums Chart Year-End listings for 2017 and 2018, respectively.

Track listing

Personnel

Vocals

 Ariana Grande – vocals 
 Iggy Azalea – vocals 
 Jessie J – vocals 
 Nicki Minaj – vocals 
 Mac Miller – vocals 
 The Weeknd – vocals 
 Future – vocals 
 Big Sean – vocals 
 Stevie Wonder – vocals 
 John Legend – vocals

Production

 Max Martin – production , vocal production 
 Zedd – production 
 Ilya – production , vocal production , co-production 
 Peter Carlsson – vocal production 
 Shellback – production 
 Antonio Dixon – production 
 Kenneth "Babyface" Edmonds – production 
 Kuk Harrell – vocal production 
 Rickard Göransson – production 
 Carl Falk – production 
 Giorgio Tuinfort – co-production 
 Rami – production 
 Savan Kotecha – vocal production 
 Ariana Grande – vocal production 
 Harmony – production 
 Sauce – vocal production 
 Tommy Brown – production 
 Twice as Nice – production 
 Ali Payami – production 
 Peter Svensson – production 
 Jo Blaq – vocal production 
 Mikey – additional production 
 Mo-Keyz – additional production 
 Johan Carlsson – production , vocal production 
 Key Wane – production 
 Benny Blanco – production 
 Harvey Mason Jr. – vocal production 
 Ryan Tedder – production 
 Ron Fair – production

Charts

Weekly charts

Year-end charts

Release history

References

2017 greatest hits albums
Ariana Grande albums
Universal Music Japan albums